A self-booting disk is a floppy disk for home computers that loads—or boots—directly into a standalone application when the system is turned on, bypassing the operating system. This was common, even standard, on some computers in the late 1970s to early 1990s. Video games were the type of application most commonly distributed using this technique.

The term "PC booter" is sometimes used in reference to self-booting software for IBM PC compatibles. On other computers, like the Apple II and Atari 8-bit family, almost all software is self-booting. On the IBM PC, the distinction is between self-booting software and that which uses MS-DOS-compatible operating systems. The term "PC booter" was not contemporary to when self-booting games were being released.

Examples 
 Between 1983 and 1984, Digital Research offered several of their business and educational applications for the IBM PC on bootable floppy diskettes bundled with SpeedStart CP/M, a reduced version of CP/M-86 as a bootable runtime environment.
 Infocom offered the only third-party games for the Macintosh at launch by distributing them with its own bootable operating system.
 A scaled down version of GeoWorks was used by America Online for their AOL client software until the late 1990s. AOL was distributed on a single 3.5-inch floppy disk, which could be used to boot GeoWorks as well.
 In 1998, Caldera distributed a demo version of their 32-bit DPMI web-browser and mail client DR-WebSpyder on a bootable fully self-contained 3.5-inch floppy. On 386 PCs with a minimum of 4 MB of RAM, the floppy would boot a minimal DR-DOS 7.02 system complete with memory manager, RAM disk, dial-up modem, LAN, mouse and display drivers and automatically launch into the graphical browser, without ever touching the machine's hard disk. Users could start browsing the web immediately after entering their access credentials.

See also 
 Boot disk
 List of self-booting IBM PC compatible games
 Live CD
 Live USB
 Portable application

References

Further reading
 

Video game distribution